Wild is a 2014 American biographical adventure drama film directed by Jean-Marc Vallée and starring Reese Witherspoon, with Laura Dern, Thomas Sadoski, Michiel Huisman, Gaby Hoffmann, Kevin Rankin, and W. Earl Brown appearing in supporting roles. The screenplay was adapted by Nick Hornby from Cheryl Strayed's 2012 memoir Wild: From Lost to Found on the Pacific Crest Trail, which is about a solo backpacking trip Strayed undertook on the trail in 1995 after numerous personal issues had left her life in shambles.

The film premiered at the Telluride Film Festival on August 29, 2014 and was released theatrically in North America on December 5, 2014. It received positive reviews and was a box office hit, grossing $52.5 million against its $15 million budget. Witherspoon and Dern received nominations at the 87th Academy Awards for Best Actress and Best Supporting Actress, respectively.

Plot
In June 1995, despite a lack of hiking experience, Cheryl Strayed leaves Minneapolis to hike, by herself,  of the  Pacific Crest Trail. During the journey, she reflects on her childhood and memories of her mother, Bobbi, whose death from cancer sent Cheryl into a deep depression that she tried to numb with heroin and anonymous sex. After her behavior destroyed her marriage and then led to an unwanted pregnancy, Cheryl had an abortion and resolved to hike the trail to try to rediscover the woman her mother raised her to be.

Cheryl begins her trek in the Mojave Desert in Southern California. On the first night, she discovers she brought the wrong type of fuel for her stove and is therefore unable to cook. After a few days of eating only cold food, she meets a farmer named Frank, who feeds her and takes her to get the correct fuel.

Further along the trail, Cheryl meets a hiker named Greg, who agrees to help her plan the next section of her hike when they get to Kennedy Meadows. While she is there, a camper named Ed helps her strategically lighten her overweight backpack and arrange to replace her undersized hiking boots with a new pair, which will be delivered somewhere further along the trail. At this and various other stops, Cheryl's best friend Aimee sends her provisions, and she also receives letters from her ex-husband Paul, who still cares about Cheryl, congratulating her on her progress.

Cheryl takes Greg's advice to avoid some upcoming deep snow in the Sierra Nevada by catching a bus to Reno and rejoining the PCT, deciding to extend her trip further into Oregon so she can walk the same distance as she had planned, but she still encounters quite a bit of snow. She is able to make it through and arrives at the town where her new boots were sent, though she has to walk the last 50 miles in sandals reinforced with duct tape after she accidentally knocks one of the small boots down a steep slope.

An empty water tank in the desert beyond the town leads Cheryl to go without water for a full day in extreme heat before, dehydrated and near exhaustion, she finds a muddy puddle from which she can get potable water using her portable water purifier. While she waits for the water to disinfect, two hunters approach and make suggestive remarks, leaving Cheryl feeling threatened and vulnerable. One returns later in the day, but leaves when his friend calls for him, so Cheryl runs until she is sure she is not being followed.

Cheryl crosses into Oregon and goes to Ashland. She meets Jonathan, who invites her to a tribute concert to the recently-deceased Jerry Garcia, and they spend the night together.

Sometime later, after visiting Crater Lake, Cheryl gets to Mount Hood National Forest, where she encounters a friendly group of young male hikers who recognize her from the brief quotes and poems that she frequently writes alongside her signature in the hiker's record books along the PCT.

One rainy day, Cheryl finds a llama that escaped from a young boy hiking with his grandmother. She returns it and chats with the boy, who asks about her parents. When she mentions her mother is dead, the boy sings her "Red River Valley", which his mother used to sing to him. The boy and his grandmother carry on down the trail, and Cheryl breaks down and cries.

On September 15, after 94 days of travel, Cheryl reaches the Bridge of the Gods on the Columbia River between Oregon and Washington, ending her journey. At various points along the trail, including at the bridge, she has encountered a red fox, which she interprets as being the spirit of her mother watching over her. As she walks onto the bridge, her future-self reflects, via voice-over, on what she learned from her trip, and reveals that four years later she remarried at a spot near the bridge, nine years later she had a son, and ten years later she had a daughter, who she named Bobbi, after her mother.

Cast

 Reese Witherspoon as Cheryl Strayed
 Bobbi Strayed Lindstrom (daughter of the real-life Cheryl Strayed) as Cheryl (6 Yrs Old)
 Laura Dern as Barbara "Bobbi" Grey, Cheryl's mother
 Thomas Sadoski as Paul, Cheryl's ex-husband (based on Marco Littig, the real-life Cheryl's ex-husband)
 Michiel Huisman as Jonathan, a man Cheryl has sex with after meeting him in Ashland, Oregon
 Gaby Hoffmann as Aimee, Cheryl's best friend in Minnesota
 Kevin Rankin as Greg, a hiker Cheryl meets on the trail who ends up quitting (based on Roger Carpenter)
 W. Earl Brown as Frank, a farmer who lets Cheryl eat, shower, and sleep at the home he shares with his wife, Annette
 Mo McRae as Jimmy Carter, a reporter who interviews Cheryl for the "Hobo Times" after mistaking her for a hobo drifter
 Keene McRae as Leif, Cheryl's younger brother
 Brian Van Holt as the Ranger in Mount Hood National Forest who reopens the station for Cheryl and brings her breakfast
 Cliff DeYoung as Ed, a man at Kennedy Meadows trail stop who helps Cheryl
 Ray Buckley (credited as Ray Mist) as Joe, Cheryl's drug-addicted boyfriend who got her pregnant, resulting in an abortion
 Randy Schulman as the Therapist that Cheryl sees after Bobbi's death
 Cathryn de Prume as Stacey Johnson, a female hiker Cheryl meets at a stop on the trail
 Charles Baker as T.J., the more threatening of a pair of hunters Cheryl meets on the trail
 J.D. Evermore as Clint, the less threatening of a pair of hunters Cheryl meets on the trail
 Beth Hall as the Desk Clerk at the motel where Cheryl stays before beginning her hike
 Jan Hoag as Annette (Frank's Wife)
 Art Alexakis as the Tattooist
 Anne Gee Byrd as Vera, a woman Cheryl meets on the trail; Kyle's grandmother
 Evan O'Toole as Kyle, a young boy Cheryl meets on the trail; Vera's grandson
 Jason Newell as Cheryl's Dad (Ronald Nylund)

Cheryl Strayed makes a cameo appearance at the beginning of the film as the woman who drops off the character of Cheryl at the motel where she stays before beginning her hike.

Production
On March 8, 2012, Reese Witherspoon announced she planned to make a film based on Cheryl Strayed's memoir Wild: From Lost to Found on the Pacific Crest Trail through her new production company, Pacific Standard, as well as star as Strayed in the production. In July 2013, Fox Searchlight Pictures acquired the rights to the project, with Nick Hornby writing and Witherspoon, Bruna Papandrea, and Bill Pohlad producing. In August 2013, Canadian Jean-Marc Vallée signed on to direct.

Principal photography for the film began on October 11, 2013, with shooting occurring on location in Oregon and California. Strayed was available to the production during their time in Oregon. On the rigors of shooting, Witherspoon stated:

By far, this is the hardest movie I've ever made in my life. I didn't hike a thousand miles, of course, but it was a different kind of physical rigor. I'd run up a hill with a 45-pound backpack on, and they'd say, 'Wait, that backpack doesn't look heavy enough. Put this 65-pound backpack on and run up the hill nine or ten times.' We literally didn't stop shooting in those remote locations—we wouldn't break for lunch, we'd just eat snacks. No bathroom breaks. It was crazy, but it was so wonderful. It was complete immersion, and I've never felt closer to a crew. We literally pulled each other up the mountains and carried each others' equipment.

Music
The film's soundtrack, supervised by Susan Jacobs, was released by Sony's Legacy Recordings on November 10, 2014. It contains 15 tracks from various eras of music. Vallée said: "The main direction with music was to use it only during flashbacks. [...] What Cheryl is listening to in her life, is the music that we hear during the film."

A song featured prominently throughout the film is the Simon & Garfunkel recording of "El Cóndor Pasa (If I Could)", which was used primarily to evoke Cheryl's memory of her mother. Jacobs explained: "This isn't about reality. This is about keeping the essence of the mother there."

Release
Wild premiered on August 29, 2014, at the Telluride Film Festival, and was featured at the Toronto International Film Festival on September 8 and the San Diego Film Festival on September 24. It was released theatrically in North America on December 3.

The Bridge of the Gods, where Strayed's journey ends, enjoyed increased popularity and traffic after the film came out, leading to an increase in its toll.

Reception

On review aggregator website Rotten Tomatoes, the film holds an approval rating of 88% based on 276 reviews, with an average rating of 7.50/10; the site's critical consensus reads: "Powerfully moving and emotionally resonant, Wild finds director Jean-Marc Vallée and star Reese Witherspoon working at the peak of their respective powers." Metacritic, which uses a weighted average, assigned the film a score of 76 out of 100 based on 47 reviews, indicating "generally favorable reviews". Audiences polled by CinemaScore gave the film an average grade of "A−" on an A+ to F scale.

A.O. Scott of The New York Times wrote that Witherspoon, who appears in nearly every frame of the film, portrayed Strayed "with grit, wit and unblinking honesty." He added that the "most audacious" element of the film was its respect for the "free-associative, memory-driven narrative" in Strayed's written memoir, asserting that the film exhibits a "thrilling disregard" for conventions of commercial cinematic storytelling to demonstrate that images and emotions can carry meaning more effectively than "neatly packaged scenes or carefully scripted character arcs." Stephen Farber of The Hollywood Reporter praised Witherspoon and Dern's performances, as well as Vallée, who he said "has crafted a vivid wilderness adventure film that is also a powerful story of family anguish and survival", and Hornby, for adapting "the book with finesse." Justin Chang of Variety said: "It's no surprise that the versatile Vallée, who recently directed two Oscar-winning performances in Dallas Buyers Club, has elicited from Witherspoon an intensely committed turn that, in its blend of grit, vulnerability, physical bravery and emotional immediacy, represents easily her most affecting and substantial work in the nine years since Walk the Line [...] Nor is it a surprise that Vallée, whose bracingly sharp editing on Dallas Buyers Club was one of that film's more unsung virtues, has applied similarly bold cutting-room strategies here." Pete Hammond of Deadline Hollywood echoed these statements, feeling Witherspoon "nails it" and that she "delivers her best screen work since her Oscar-winning turn in Walk the Line, and this three-dimensional portrayal of a woman searching for herself [...] is certain to put her back in the thick of the Best Actress race". My Film Habit critic Allison M. Lyzenga said: "It was trying to be a lot of things, and don't think it really accomplished all of them, but it was still interesting enough.  So, it's worth a rental."

Strayed stated that the film was snubbed from the Best Picture category at the Academy Awards due to "Hollywood sexism." Seven of the eight nominees for the 2014 Best Picture award revolve almost entirely around male characters.

Accolades

See also
Into the Wild, a 2007 film about a young man's solo journey into the Alaskan wilderness

References

External links
 
 
 
 
 

2010s American films
2010s English-language films
2010s drama road movies
2014 biographical drama films
2014 drama films
2014 films
2014 independent films
American biographical drama films
American drama road movies
American independent films
American nonlinear narrative films
American survival films
Biographical films about sportspeople
Drama films based on actual events
English-language drama films
Films about drugs
Films about hiking
Films based on autobiographies
Films directed by Jean-Marc Vallée
Films produced by Reese Witherspoon
Films set in 1995
Films set in California
Films set in Minnesota
Films set in Oregon
Films shot in California
Films shot in Oregon
Films with screenplays by Nick Hornby
Fox Searchlight Pictures films
TSG Entertainment films